Kartikesvara Siva Temple (Location: Lat. 20° 14’27" N., Long. 85° 50’ 12"E., Elev. 73 ft) is situated at a distance of about 100 m from eastern gateway of Lingaraj temple. It is on the left side of the temple road leading from Lingaraja to Garej Chowk, Bhubaneswar, within the precinct of Gandhi Garabadu which is now under the Lingaraja Temple Administration.

Ownership

i) Single/ Multiple         : Single.

ii) Public/ Private         : Private.

iii) Chief priest           : Gandhi Garabadu.

1v) Address                 : Old Town, Bhubaneswar.

Age 
i)Precise date              : Unknown

ii) Approximate date        : 13th Century A.D

iii) Source of Information  : The temple is dated on basis of architectural features and building material.

Property Type 

i) Precinct/ Building/ Structure/Landscape/Site/Tank: Building.

ii) Subtype: Temple.

iii) Typology: The vimana is rekha deul and Jagamohana is a pidha deul.

Property use
i) Abandoned/ in use         : In use.

ii) Present use              : Living temple.

iii) Past use                : Worshipped

Significance 
i) Historic significance  : Built during the Ganga period.

ii) Cultural significance : Gandhi Garabadu Mahaprasada Anusthana operates in the precinct.

Plan 

i) Surrounding: 
The temple is surrounded by residential buildings in the eastern side and local shops (Cabins) market complex in the southern side.

ii) Orientation: 
Facing towards west.

iii) Architectural features (Plan and Elevation): 
The temple is buried up to the jangha portion. It is pancharatha on plan as distinguished by a central raha and pair of anuratha and kanika pagas on either side of the raha. The vimana is of rekha order and jaga mohan is a pidha deul. The visible portion measures 6.40 m from the present ground level.

iv) Raha niche & parsva devatas:
The niches in the eastern side measures 0.82 m in height x 0.55 m in width with a depth of 0.46 m while the other niches are buried.

v) Decorative features: 
The temple walls are plain.

Doorjambs: 
The doorjambs of jagamohana carved with three plain vertical bands measures 1.58 m in height and 1.30 m in width. At the lalatabimba there is a Gajalaxmi seated in lalitasana and flanked by two elephants on either side standing on full blown lotus.

Lintel: The architrave above the doorjamb is carved with the usual navagraha.

vi) Building material:
Laterite

vii) Construction techniques: 
Dry masonry

viii) Style:
Kalingan

ix) Special features, if any: 
The gandi is decorated with angasikharas and bhumi amlas. Since the temple is pancharatha in plan and the pilasters are also carved as pancharatha.

State of preservation

i) Good/Fair/ Showing Signs of Deterioration/Advanced: The temple is in advance stage of deterioration.

ii) State of Decay/Danger of Disappearance: Very fast, due to the growth of vegetation like pipal tree and absence of mastaka.

Condition description

i) Signs of distress: Rain water is seeping inside the sanctum due to the absence of mastaka and stagnating inside the sanctum.

ii) Structural problems: Completely damaged up to the gandi portion.

iii) Repairs and Maintenance: No work of repair or maintenance in the recent past seems to have been done.

Grade (A/B/C)
i) Architecture: B

ii) Historic: C

iii) Associational: C

iv) Social/Cultural: C

Threats to the property

Conservation Problem and Remedies:
Encroachment problem and growth of vegetation mainly on the roof of the jagamohana and vimana and seepage of rain water directly into the sanctum. It is now in a bad state of preservation.

Compound Wall: There is no compound wall but it is within the boundary wall of Gandhi garabadu Mahaprasada Anusthana and Narayana Maharana's residencial plot.

References
http://www.ignca.nic.in/asi_reports/orkhurda081.pdf
http://ignca.nic.in/asp/showbig.asp?projid=orkhr0810001
 :Category:Shiva temples
 List of Hindu temples in India#Orissa
www.eodissa.com
Book: Lesser Known Monuments of Bhubaneswar by Dr. Sadasiba Pradhan

Shiva temples in Odisha
13th-century Hindu temples
Hindu temples in Bhubaneswar